The Mangawharariki River is a river of the Manawatū-Whanganui region of New Zealand's North Island. It flows northwest from the Ruahine Range to meet the Rangitikei River at Mangaweka.

See also
List of rivers of New Zealand

References

Rivers of Manawatū-Whanganui
Rivers of New Zealand